The girls' giant slalom competition of the 2020 Winter Youth Olympics was held at the Les Diablerets Alpine Centre, Switzerland, on 12 January.

Results
The race was started at 10:00 (Run 1) and 12:45 (Run 2).

References

Girls' giant slalom